The 2011 ICC Africa Twenty20 Division One was an international Twenty20 cricket tournament that took place between 9–15 July 2011. It was the inaugural edition of the ICC Africa Twenty20 Championship's Division One. Uganda hosted the event, with all matches played in the capital, Kampala.

Teams
Teams that qualified are as follows:

Squads

Fixtures

Group stage

Points Table

Matches

Play-offs

3rd place play-off

Final

Statistics

Highest team totals
The following table lists the six highest team scores.

Most runs
The top five highest run scorers (total runs) are included in this table.

Highest scores
This table contains the top five highest scores made by a batsman in a single innings.

Most wickets
The following table contains the five leading wicket-takers.

Best bowling figures
This table lists the top five players with the best bowling figures.

See also

2012 ICC World Twenty20 Qualifier
World Cricket League Africa Region

References

2012 ICC World Twenty20
2011 in Ugandan cricket
International cricket competitions in 2011
International cricket competitions in Uganda